Capellen Orchestra is a custom sized studio symphony (100+), utilizing selective musicians from the Czech Republic, Slovakia, Austria and Hungary, formed by and exclusively used by Capellen Music Production. In 2011, Capellen Orchestra & Choir were nominated for the award for best performance of Jo Blankenburg "Satorius" by the Hollywood Music in Media.

Discography
 Dynasty (2007)
 Legend (2008)
 Storm Rider Clash of the Evils (2008)
 The Devil Wears Nada (2009)
 Three Kingdoms: Resurrection of the Dragon (2009)
 Power of Darkness (2010)
 Invincible (2010)
 Echoes of the Rainbow OST (2010)
 The Tudors Season 4 OST (2010)
 The Pillars of the Earth (TV miniseries) OST (2010)
 The Stool Pigeon OST (film) (2010)
 14 Blades OST (2010) 
 Vendetta (2011)
 The Human Experience OST (2011)
 Illusions (2011)
 Nero (2011)
 SkyWorld (2012)
 Tiara Concerto Online OST (2013)
 Sun (2014)
 Battlecry (2015)
 Vanquish (2016)

Filmography
 Storm Rider Clash of the Evils (2008)
 The Human Experience (2008)
 The Sniper (2009 film) (2009)
 Three Kingdoms: Resurrection of the Dragon (2009)
 The Road Less Travelled (2010)
 Fire of Conscience (2010)
 Future X-Cops (2010)
 14 Blades (2010)
 The Tudors (2010)
 The Pillars of the Earth (TV miniseries) (2010)
 The Stool Pigeon (film) (2010)
 The Lost Bladesman (2010)
 Lee's Adventure (2011)
 White Vengeance (2011)
 The Four (2012)
 Unbeatable (2013)

Video Games
 Star Citizen

External links
 
 Hollywood Music in Media, 2011 Visual Media Nominees 
 Vendetta: Behind the Scenes - video documentary

Czech orchestras